Aco Jovanovski (1930–2016) was a Macedonian film and television actor. He made his screen debut in 1952 in Frosina, the first ever Macedonian language film.

His daughter Silvija Stojanovska is an actress.

Selected filmography
 Frosina (1952)
 The False Passport (1959)
 A Quiet Summer (1961)
 Mountain of Wrath (1968)
 Times Without War (1969)
 The Price of a Town (1970)
 Black Seed (1971)
 Seljacka buna 1573 (1975)
 The Red Horse (1980)
 The Lead Brigade (1980)

References

Bibliography 
 Daniel J. Goulding. Liberated Cinema: The Yugoslav Experience, 1945-2001. Indiana University Press, 2002.

External links 
 

1930 births
2016 deaths
Macedonian male film actors
Macedonian male television actors
Male actors from Skopje
Yugoslav male actors